Tom Hansen (born November 8, 1946)  is a politician from the U.S. state of Nebraska.  He served two terms in the Nebraska Legislature, from 2007 to 2015.

Hansen was born on November 8, 1946, in North Platte, Nebraska and graduated from North Platte High School in 1965. He then earned a Bachelor of Science degree from the University of Nebraska-Lincoln in 1970. He is married and has two children. He is employed in the administration of his family's cattle ranching operation. Prior to his election to the State Legislature, Hansen served on the board of the Twin Platte Natural Resources District.

Hansen was elected in 2006 to represent the 42nd Nebraska legislative district, which consists of Lincoln County.  Because of the state's term-limits law, incumbent Don Pederson was ineligible to run for a third consecutive term.  Hansen, North Platte businessman Mark Kaschke, and North Platte attorney Ron Ruff ran for the open seat.  In the nonpartisan primary election, Hansen finished first with 42% of the vote, followed by Kaschke with 31%.  In the general election, Hansen secured 57% of the vote to Kaschke's 43%.

In 2010, Hansen ran unopposed for re-election to his legislative seat.

Under Nebraska's term-limits law, Hansen could not run for a third consecutive term in 2014.  He was succeeded by Mike Groene.

References

1946 births
Living people
Nebraska state senators
People from North Platte, Nebraska